Hanns Peters (13 January 1930 – 31 March 2015) was a German rower. He competed in the men's coxless four event at the 1952 Summer Olympics, representing Saar.

References

1930 births
2015 deaths
German male rowers
Olympic rowers of Saar
Rowers at the 1952 Summer Olympics
Sportspeople from Saarbrücken